Mohamed Amanissi (born July 29, 1981) is a Moroccan boxer who qualified for the 2008 Olympics at Super Heavyweight.

At the 2005 World Championships he lost against Mike Wilson 20:27, in 2007 he lost to Czech Vladimir Prusa 16:22. At the first qualifier 2008 he lost to local Newfel Ouatah 8:21. In the final of the second Qualification tournament he beat fellow qualifier Onorede Ehwareme 10:2.

He missed qualification for the Athens Games by ending up in third place at the 1st AIBA African 2004 Olympic Qualifying Tournament in Casablanca, Morocco.

External links
2nd Qualifier

1981 births
Olympic boxers of Morocco
Living people
Heavyweight boxers
Boxers at the 2008 Summer Olympics
Moroccan male boxers